Adam and Joe Go Tokyo was a series of eight episodes created for BBC Three (also airing in full on BBC One at a later timeslot as promotion for the new channel). It starred Adam Buxton and Joe Cornish of The Adam and Joe Show and aired from 30 May 2003 to 25 July 2003. The aim of the show was to offer an alternative insight into the lives of Tokyo's citizens, with the obligatory look at a number of gadgets and toys along the way. The show took the format of a mature Blue Peter outlining many pastimes of the average (or less so) Japanese person, everything from competitive speed eating to manga cosplay. Each episode would end with a Japanese band joining the show to perform.

Gaijin Invasion
In each episode, Adam and Joe documented their attempts to become "Big in Japan". In one episode, they resorted to busking in a local park. They performed an unnamed tribute to Tokyo wearing sneakers and black diving suits. As luck would have it, they were spotted by somebody working for a Japanese music television show and were asked to participate in it.

Guests
Each week there were around two guests on the show ranging from professional cosplayers to the Japanese expert on fish.

Episode details

See also
 Japanorama

External links
 

2003 British television series debuts
2003 British television series endings
2000s British comedy television series
BBC television comedy
Street performance
English-language television shows
Television shows set in Tokyo